Sten Moe (20 March 1906 – 27 May 1975) was a Norwegian footballer. He played in six matches for the Norway national football team from 1928 to 1936.

References

External links
 

1906 births
1975 deaths
Norwegian footballers
Norway international footballers
Place of birth missing
Association footballers not categorized by position